Coleophora sahariana is a moth of the family Coleophoridae.

References

sahariana
Moths described in 1997